Katharine Isabella Williams (c. 1848 - 16 January 1917) was a British chemist who became a student, aged 29, at University College Bristol. She was known for her collaboration in the 1880s with Nobel prize winning Scottish chemist, William Ramsay and was also one of the signatories of the 1904 petition for the admission of women to the Chemical Society.

Life 

Katharine Williams was born at Llanvapley in Monmouthshire, daughter of Thomas Williams, later Dean of Llandaff. She was educated at King Edward VI High School for Girls, Birmingham. She resided for much of her life with her elder sister Elizabeth at Llandaff House, 1 Pembroke Vale, in Clifton, Bristol, where she died in 1917.

Research 
She worked with William Ramsay on studies of atmospheric gases, before moving on to conduct her own research in food analysis. She published for over 14 years, authoring 10 papers, including two published in the Journal of the American Chemical Society (1904 and 1907). In 1909 she was one of the 24 female members of the 7th International Chemical Congress in London, and in 1910, by which time she was in her sixties, she gained a B.Sc. by research from University College Bristol, where she was considered to be one of the few advanced students capable of performing research.

References 

British women chemists
1848 births
1917 deaths
People educated at King Edward VI High School for Girls, Birmingham
Alumni of the University of Bristol
Scientists from Bristol